Leonidas Kampantais (born 8 March 1982) is a Greek professional footballer who plays as a striker for Atlantis Anthoussa.

Career

Aris
Born in Athens, Greece, Kampantais began his professional career at Aris Thessaloniki F.C. in 2002, appearing in 11 matches in Alpha Ethniki (in 2006 renamed to Super League), scoring two goals. He remained in Salonica for another year, scoring one goal in seven appearances.

Move to AEK Athens
He joined AEK Athens in 2004. Kampantais picked number 11, which was used by Demis Nikolaidis, who was a fan favourite and current Chairman of AEK Athens.

In the 2005–06 season, Fernando Santos proposed him to go on loan, to gain the required experience. He agreed, and moved to Anorthosis Famagusta FC, where Temuri Ketsbaia (a former player of AEK Athens) was a player-manager. However, Kabantais returned after six months, in January 2006, after scoring only two goals and wasting numerous goal opportunities in 14 matches. Kampantais claimed that the reason Anorthosis released him due to personal problems he had with player-manager Ketsbaia which appeared to be true. He moved then to Panionios NFC for six months.

In 2006, Ilija Ivic told him that the best for him was to go on-loan again. However, Kampantais was unwilling to go, unless the new manager Lorenzo Serra Ferrer would tell him so. Serra Ferrer gave him enough chances to prove his worth, but did not register him for the UEFA Champions League matches, which upset Kampantais.

Even though not considered as a first team regular, he was one of the best players in the friendly matches. Serra Ferrer trusted him in the derby against Panathinaikos. Kampantais, even though he did not score, played a good match.

The next matches in which Kampantais played were versus Aris and Larissa. These two matches were critical for AEK, and Kampantais managed to score in each game once (in both matches he was in the first team). Versus Kerkyra, Kampantais was awarded two clear penalties. He was announced as Most Valuable Player in that match. That was the first time Kampantais was given this award.

Since then, he appeared in every match and scored some goals. He was voted one of the two MVP in the big derby against Olympiakos in early February.

His contract with AEK expired in summer 2007. On 21 May 2007, he was released by AEK and signed by German team Arminia Bielefeld.

Arminia Bielefeld
Kampantais began his Bundesliga career with Arminia Bielefeld in 2007. On 30 June 2009, Bielefeld did not renew Kampantais's contract and so he was released.

Return to Greece
Kampantais began his Beta Ethniki career in Olympiakos Volou in summer 2009. After a year, he moved to Super League Greece, to play for OFI, and in June 2012 he signed a two-year contract with Panionios. On 10 September 2015, after a year as a free agent, he signed a year contract with Football League club Kerkyra for an undisclosed fee.

References

External links
 
Profile at Onsports.gr 

Living people
1982 births
Association football forwards
Greek expatriate footballers
AEK Athens F.C. players
Anorthosis Famagusta F.C. players
Aris Thessaloniki F.C. players
Arminia Bielefeld players
Olympiacos Volos F.C. players
OFI Crete F.C. players
Panionios F.C. players
Super League Greece players
Bundesliga players
Expatriate footballers in Germany
Expatriate footballers in Cyprus
Footballers from Athens
Greek footballers
Greek expatriate sportspeople in Germany